Sherbakulsky District is an administrative and municipal district (raion), one of the thirty-two in Omsk Oblast, Russia. It is located in the southwest of the oblast on the border with Kazakhstan. Its administrative center is the urban locality (a work settlement) of Sherbakul. Population: 21,342 (2010 Census);  The population of Sherbakul accounts for 32.7% of the district's total population.

History
The territory of what is now Sherbakulsky District was a part of the Kazakh Khanate until 1718, when, after the death of Tauke Khan, the khanate broke apart and Cossack units moving south from Russia occupied the area. In the 1890s, these former Kazakh grazing lands were opened for settlement. In 1893, the first settlement was established at Borisovka by Russian and Ukrainian settlers. In 1895, German settlers established Krasnoyarka, and in 1896—Maksimovka.

Modern Sherbakulsky District was created on October 14, 1924 as part of the Soviet reorganization of the oblast structure under the State Division of Soviet Middle Asian Republics.

Administrative and municipal divisions
As an administrative division, the district is divided into one work settlement (Sherbakul) and nine rural okrugs (Alexandrovsky, Babezhsky, Borisovsky, Izyumovsky, Krasnoyarsky, Kutuzovsky, Maksimovsky, Slavyansky, and Yekaterinoslavsky) comprising thirty-seven rural localities.

As a municipal division, the district is incorporated as Sherbakulsky Municipal District and divided into one urban settlement (within the borders of the work settlement of Sherbakul) and nine rural settlements (which correspond to the rural okrugs).

Notable people
Zhumabay Shayakhmetov (1902–1966), First Secretary of the Communist Party of the Kazakh SSR 1946–1954
Baltash Tursymbaev (1946–2022), Kazakh diplomat and politician

References

Notes

Sources

Districts of Omsk Oblast